Barry Paul Manuel (born August 12, 1965) is a former professional baseball pitcher. He played all or part of five seasons in Major League Baseball between 1991 and 1998, and one season in Nippon Professional Baseball in 1999.

In high school Manuel made the all-state team in 1984 and went on to play for LSU from 1984-87. In 1986 he was voted on the College Baseball All-American team. He was drafted by the Texas Rangers in the second round of the 1987 Major League Baseball draft. Manuel was 26 years old when he broke into the big leagues on September 6, 1991, with the Texas Rangers.

After his major league career, Manuel played one game for the Seibu Lions in Japan in 1999.

Up in till the 2016-2017 school year Barry served as the head baseball coach and the gameday football coordinator for Westminster Christian Academy in Opelousas, Louisiana. 

Barry currently serves as the head baseball coach for St Edmund Catholic School in Eunice, Louisiana.

Sources

External links

The Baseball Gauge
Venezuela Winter League

1965 births
Living people
American expatriate baseball players in Canada
American expatriate baseball players in Japan
Arizona Diamondbacks players
Arizona League Diamondbacks players
Baseball players from Louisiana
Charlotte Rangers players
Gulf Coast Rangers players
Lafayette Bullfrogs players
Leones del Caracas players
American expatriate baseball players in Venezuela
Louisiana State University alumni
LSU Tigers baseball players
Major League Baseball pitchers
Montreal Expos players
New York Mets players
Nippon Professional Baseball pitchers
Norfolk Tides players
Oklahoma City 89ers players
Ottawa Lynx players
People from Mamou, Louisiana
Rochester Red Wings players
Seibu Lions players
Texas Rangers players
Tucson Sidewinders players
Tulsa Drillers players